The Argentine bolo mouse (Necromys benefactus) is a species of rodent in the family Cricetidae. It is endemic to central Argentina, where it is found in the pampas and the drier espinal (lowland thorn brush).

References

Mammals of Argentina
Necromys
Endemic fauna of Argentina
Mammals described in 1919
Taxa named by Oldfield Thomas